Psychotria forsteriana is a South American rainforest understory shrub from the family Rubiaceae.

References

External links

Flora of Brazil
forsteriana